Amorphoscelis annulicornis is a species of praying mantis found in Sri Lanka, India, Nepal, and Malaysia.

See also
List of mantis genera and species

References

Amorphoscelis
Insects described in 1871
Mantodea of Asia